Limnocnida is a genus of hydrozoans belonging to the family Olindiidae.

The species of this genus are found in Southern Africa.

Species:

Limnocnida biharensis 
Limnocnida congoensis 
Limnocnida indica 
Limnocnida nepalensis 
Limnocnida tanganjicae 
Limnocnida victoriae

References

Olindiidae
Hydrozoan genera